Scheidegg may refer to:

Scheidegg, Bavaria, a town in southern Bavaria, Germany
Scheidegg (Rigi), a mountain summit of the Rigi massif in Schwyz, Switzerland
The Grosse Scheidegg, a mountain pass between Meiringen and Grindelwald in the canton of Bern, Switzerland
The Kleine Scheidegg, a mountain pass between Grindelwald and Lauterbrunnen in the canton of Bern, Switzerland